Georg Anton Benda (30 June 17226 November 1795) was a composer, violinist and Kapellmeister of the classical period from the Kingdom of Bohemia.

Biography

Born into a family of notable musicians in Old Benatek (today Benátky nad Jizerou), Bohemia, he studied at the Piarist Gymnasium (grammar school) in Kosmanos and at the Jesuit Gymnasium in Gitschin from 1735 to 1742. Benda was 19 when Frederick the Great bestowed upon him in 1741 the position of second violinist in the chapel of Berlin. The following year Benda was summoned to Potsdam as a composer and arranger for his older brother Franz, himself an illustrious composer and violinist. Seven years later, in 1749, he entered the service of the Duke of Gotha as Kapellmeister, where he constantly cultivated his talents for composition, specializing in religious music.

A stipend from the duke allowed Benda to take a study trip to Italy in 1764. He returned to Gotha in 1766, and devoted himself to composition. In 1778 he resigned his position and visited Hamburg, Vienna and other cities, and finally settled at the little hamlet of Köstritz.

Benda's most important contribution lies in the development of the German melodramas, a form of musical stage entertainment which influenced Mozart. In 1774, the Swiss-born director Abel Seyler's theatrical company arrived in Gotha, and Seyler commissioned Benda to write several successful melodramas, including Ariadne auf Naxos, Medea and Pygmalion. Ariadne auf Naxos is generally considered his best work. At its debut in 1775, the opera received enthusiastic reviews in Germany and afterwards, in the whole of Europe, with music critics calling attention to its originality, sweetness, and ingenious execution. Besides that he wrote many instrumental pieces including many sinfonias, keyboard sonatas, keyboard concertos, violin concertos and a smaller number of trio sonatas, violin sonatas and flute sonatas.

Benda also wrote music for masonic rituals.

Benda died in Köstritz, Saxe-Gotha-Altenburg, at the age of 73, leaving his son, Friedrich Ludwig Benda (1752–1796), who briefly carried on the family musical tradition, serving as a music director in Hamburg and later in Mecklenburg, before finally becoming the concertmaster in Königsberg. He died less than a year after his father.

Benda's Harpsichord Concerto in C was featured in Apple Computer's 1989 Knowledge Navigator concept video.

Operas
 (libretto by Giovanni Andrea Galletti, opera seria, 1765, Gotha)
 (libretto by Galletti, Intermezzo, 1766, Gotha)
 (Intermezzo, 1766, Gotha)
 (libretto by Friedrich Wilhelm Gotter, Singspiel, 1775, Gotha)
Medea (libretto by Gotter, melodrama, 1775, Leipzig)
Walder (libretto by Gotter, Singspiel, 1776, Gotha)
 (libretto by Gotter, Singspiel, 1776, Gotha)
 (libretto by Gotter, Singspiel, 1778, Gotha)
Pygmalion (libretto by Gotter, melodrama, 1779, Vienna)
, revised as Almansor und Nadine (1791), (unknown librettist, melodrama, 1779, Vienna)
 (libretto by Gotter, Singspiel, 1787, Mannheim)

References

Further reading

"4. Georg (Anton)  Benda" by John D. Drake, Thomas Bauman, Zdeňka Pilková, chapter 4 of "Benda family" in Grove Music Online  
"1. Georg (Anton)  Benda" by Thomas Bauman, chapter 1 of "Benda family (opera)" in Grove Music Online

External links

List of operas, italianopera.org

1722 births
1795 deaths
18th-century Bohemian musicians
18th-century classical composers
18th-century German composers
18th-century male musicians
18th-century musicians
Composers of masonic music
Czech Classical-period composers
Czech male classical composers
Czech opera composers
German male classical composers
German opera composers
Male opera composers
People from Benátky nad Jizerou
People from the Kingdom of Bohemia
Seyler theatrical company